Cornus officinalis, the Japanese cornel or Japanese cornelian cherry, is a species of flowering plant in the dogwood family Cornaceae. Despite its name, it is native to China and Korea as well as Japan. It is not to be confused with C. mas, which is also known as the Cornelian cherry. It is not closely related to the true cherries of the genus Prunus.

Description
It is a large, strongly-growing deciduous shrub with rough flaky bark. Umbels of acid yellow flowers appear in early spring before the oval leaves. The red berries, which are edible, appear later in the summer, and the leaves turn shades of red before falling in the autumn.

Etymology

The Latin specific epithet officinalis refers to plants which have some medicinal or culinary use - in this case the edible berries.

Cultivation
The plant is valued in cultivation for providing year-round interest in the garden. The cultivar 'Kintoki', with larger and more abundant flowers, has won the Royal Horticultural Society's Award of Garden Merit.

Traditional medicine
It occurs in China, Japan and Korea where it is used as a food plant and as a medicinal plant.

Chemical constituents
The plant contains oleanolic acid and ursolic acid. Ursolic acid has shown in vitro protective effects on auditory cells.

Ethanolic extracts of the fruit of C. officinalis has been shown to prevent hepatic injuries associated with acetaminophen-induced liver injury-induced hepatotoxicity (in mice) by preventing or alleviating oxidative stress.

The chemical constituents isolated from the fruit (Corni fructus) have protective effects on beta cells in vitro, and may control postprandial hyperglycemia by alpha-glucosidase inhibition.

Cornel iridoid glycoside, a chemical extracted from Cornus officinalis, promoted neurogenesis and angiogenesis and improved neurological function after ischemia in rats.

Morroniside, the most abundant iridoid glycoside extracted from Cornus officinalis, substantially reduces osteophyte formation and subchondral sclerosis in mice models. Specifically, morroniside significantly promotes cartilage matrix synthesis by increasing collagen type II expression and suppressing chondrocyte pyroptosis. It inhibits matrix metalloproteinase-13 (MMP13), Caspase-1 and nod-like receptor protein-3 (NLRP3) expression in DMM mice and IL-1β-stimulated chondrocytes, and enhances chondrocyte proliferation and inhibits chondrocyte apoptosis. It also slows OA progression by inhibiting nuclear factor-κB (NF-κB) signaling.

A randomized, double-blinded, placebo-controlled study found that a Chinese herbal formula that mainly consisted of Cornus officinalis was not only effective at improving erectile function, but it was also safe for the treatment of erectile dysfunction. A chemical substance isolated from Cornus officinalis also may enhance the motility of human sperm.

Cell cultures of C. officinalis contain gallotannins in the forms of tri-, tetra- and pentagalloylglucoses. The main tannins are 1,2,3,6-tetragalloylglucose, 1,2,6-trigalloyl-glucose, 1,2,3,4,6-pentagalloyl-glucose and 6-digalloyl-1,2,3-trigalloyl-glucose.

Nutrition
Cornelian cherry juices are rich in potassium, calcium, sodium, iron, zinc, manganese, and copper.  Compared to other juices obtained from plum, pear, and apple, Cornelian cherry juice contained higher levels of dietary minerals.

Gallery

References

External links

 Cornus officinalis
 

officinalis
Plants used in traditional Chinese medicine